Motu Iti, or Little island in the Rapa Nui language, is a small uninhabited islet near Motu Nui, about a mile from Rano Kau on the south western corner of Easter Island, a Chilean island in the Pacific. It has a land area of 1.6 hectares, which makes it the second largest of the five satellite islands of Easter Island, after Motu Nui.

Nowadays it is a bird sanctuary and part of the Rapa Nui National Park but until the late nineteenth century CE it was important to the Rapanui people both as their best source of obsidian for sharp edged tools and for an annual harvest of eggs and fledglings from the seabirds that nested on it. Motu Iti is the summit of a large volcanic mountain which rises over 2,000 meters from the sea bed.

Seabirds nesting on Motu Iti include the sooty tern.

See also
 Orongo
 Tangata Manu

References

Geography of Easter Island
Uninhabited islands of Chile